Jhon Alexander Solís Mosquera (born 24 June 1993) is a Colombian sprinter specialising in the 400 metres. He represented his country in the 4 × 400 metres relay at the 2017 World Championships without qualifying for the final. He competed at the 2020 Summer Olympics.

His personal best in the event is 46.15 seconds set in Cochabamba in 2020.

International competitions

References

1993 births
Living people
Colombian male sprinters
World Athletics Championships athletes for Colombia
Athletes (track and field) at the 2018 South American Games
Athletes (track and field) at the 2019 Pan American Games
Pan American Games gold medalists for Colombia
Pan American Games medalists in athletics (track and field)
Medalists at the 2019 Pan American Games
Athletes (track and field) at the 2020 Summer Olympics
Olympic athletes of Colombia
Sportspeople from Valle del Cauca Department
21st-century Colombian people